All India Hindustan Congress Party ( AIHCP) is a political party based in Jaipur. Rajasthan, India. The party was formed by  Budhh Prakash Sharma in 2015.

Organisation and structure

Central Working Committee
The president and the Central Working Committee (CWC) are elected by delegates from state and district parties at an annual national conference.

President
 Buddh Prakash Sharma

Vice Presidents

General Secretaries

Secretaries

Joint Secretaries

Treasurer

Legal Advisor
1 Pradeep Maheshwari (Adv)

Central Election Committee

Coordination Committee

Frontal and wing
 Student
 Women
 Youth

Department and cell
 Media department
 Social media department
 Legal, Human Rights and RTI department
 SC department
 ST department
 OBC department
 Minority department
 Farmers and Workers department
 Teacher's cell
 Professional's cell
 Trader's Cell

Elections

Gujarat Assembly election, 2017 
 The Election Commission of India has allotted Tractor Chalata Kisan (A farmer driving a tractor) symbol to AIHCP under para 10 B (2017) order dated 9 August 2017 for 2017 Gujarat Legislative Assembly election.
AIHCP contested on 95 seats in the 2017 Gujarat Legislative Assembly election under the leadership of Ex chief minister of Gujrat Shankersinh Vaghela who had floated Jan Vikalp Morcha earlier but the application for registration of Jan Vikalp Morcha was not approved by the time the elections were announced. AIHCP garnered 0.3% (83,922) of total votes and did not win any seat.

Karnataka Assembly election, 2018 
 The Election Commission of India has allotted Tractor Chalata Kisan (A farmer driving a Tractor) symbol to AIHCP for 2018 Karnataka Legislative Assembly election.
 AIHCP contested one seat in the 2018 Karnataka Legislative Assembly election . In charge National general  secretary Mohammedali Kurlageri.

Rajasthan Assembly election, 2018 
 The Election Commission of India has allotted Pen Nib With Seven Rays symbol to AIHCP under para 10 B (2018) order dated 16 August 2018 for 2018 Rajasthan Legislative Assembly election.

Madhya Pradesh Assembly election, 2018 
 The Election Commission of India has allotted Telephone symbol to AIHCP under para 10 B (2018) order dated 24 September 2018 for 2018 Madhya Pradesh Legislative Assembly election.

Chhattisgarh Assembly election, 2018 
 The Election Commission of India has allotted Telephone symbol to AIHCP under para 10 B (2018) order dated 24 September 2018 for 2018 Chhattisgarh Legislative Assembly election.

Mizoram Assembly election, 2018 
 The Election Commission of India has allotted Farmer Ploughing within Square symbol to AIHCP under para 10 B (2018) order dated 24 September 2018 for 2018 Mizoram Legislative Assembly election.

Electoral Performance

Loksabha elections

Legislative Assembly elections

See also
 Indian National Congress breakaway parties
 Elections in India
 List of political parties in India

External links
 Official Website
 Official website of Jan Vikalp

References

Political parties established in 2015
2015 establishments in Rajasthan
Political parties in Gujarat
Political parties in Karnataka
Political parties in Rajasthan
Political parties in Madhya Pradesh